Robert Peck may refer to:

 Robert Newton Peck (born 1928), American author
 Robert W. Peck, Canadian diplomat
 Bob Peck (1945–1999), English actor
 Bob Peck (American football) (1891–1932), American football player 
 Robert Peck (MP for Lincoln) (died c. 1400)
 Robert Peck (MP for Huntingdon), for Huntingdon (UK Parliament constituency)